Mukhor-Cherga (Mukur-Çargı) is a rural locality (a selo) in Shebalinsky District, the Altai Republic, Russia. The population was 127 as of 2016. There are 3 streets.

Geography 
Mukhor-Cherga is located 65 km northwest of Shebalino (the district's administrative centre) by road. Uluscherga is the nearest rural locality.

References 

Rural localities in Shebalinsky District